Yelia may refer to:
Yelia Rural LLG
Yelia (volcano)